Java Integrated Industrial and Ports Estate or JIIPE is an industrial area, integrated with deep sea port, residential estate and industrial area at Gresik, East Java, Indonesia. The project is located 24 km from Surabaya. It is a Public Private Partnership development, which is jointly developed by PT Usaha Era Pratama Nusantara, a subsidiary of PT AKR Corporindo Tbk, and PT Berlian Jasa Terminal Indonesia, a subsidiary of state owned company Pelindo III.

JIIPE is located strategically in the mouth of Madura Strait, the first integrated industrial city and port development project in Indonesia. President Joko Widodo laid the first stone for the industrial estate construction project in 2015 and officially inaugurated JIIPE in 2018.

Facilities
JIIPE has total area of 2,933 hectares, of which 1,761 hectares industrial park, 400 hectares seaport and an 800 hectares residential estate, named as Grand Estate Marina (GEM) city. It is divided into areas of Port Estate, Heavy Industry, Medium Industry, Light Industry, Commercial, Ports and Residential Areas, which can accommodate about 183 industries.

It has facilities which include,
 23-megawatt (MW) power plant
Waste-water treatment plant
Gas pipeline connected to the gas pipeline of state-owned gas distributor Perusahaan Gas Negara (PGN)
 Fiber optic telecommunication system and broadband internet
Sea port: The volume of cargo handled at Gresik SEZ port, which started operation in 2015, was up to 2 million tons and is projected to increase to 6 million tons following the completion of the jetty extension project in June 2021.

Connectivity
Other than its own sea port, JIIPE has direct access to toll roads from Gresik, Surabaya, Juanda International Airport, and Port of Tanjung Perak.

References

External links

 JIIPE

East Java
Post-independence architecture of Indonesia
Planned townships in Indonesia
Companies based in Gresik
Ports and harbours of Indonesia
Industrial parks in Indonesia